Lipakovo is a rural locality (a settlement) in Fedovskoye Rural Settlement of Plesetsky District, Arkhangelsk Oblast, Russia. The population was 356 as of 2010. There are 9 streets.

Geography 
Lipakovo is located on the Onega River, 55 km southwest of Plesetsk (the district's administrative centre) by road. Onega is the nearest rural locality.

References 

Rural localities in Plesetsky District